Mumbai Kenkre FC (also known as Kenkre Football Club) is an Indian professional football club based in Mumbai, Maharashtra. Founded in 2000, the club competes in MFA Elite Division of Mumbai Football League, and previously participated in I-League. They were relgated into I League 2 at the end of 2022–23 I-League.

History

Formation and journey
The club was founded in 2000 as Kenkre Academy FC, under the patronage of former footballer and coach Adib Kenkre, and CEO Joshua Lewis.

Kenkre FC were crowned champions of the Maha Football League in 2010 for the first time in the club's history, after defeating Bengal Mumbai FC 3–0, thanks to goals from Nigerian striker Mathew Odje, Francisco Salin and Charanjeet Singh. After achieving this result, Kenkre FC were granted admission into the I-League 2nd Division, then second-tier of Indian football.

In March 2013, ahead of the I-League Second Division kickoff, Kenkre roped in Portuguese manager Jose Luis Lopes Da Costa as head coach and brought three of their first foreigners, Portuguese Rodilson Felisberto Fernandes Dias, Domingo De Jesus Gomes, Bruno Daniel Alciaes, and Australian Daniel Atkins.

2020–present
In December 2021, the AIFF club licensing committee has unanimously decided to not grant the exemption sought by former I-League champion Chennai City FC, after having failed to receive the ICLS licence. As a result, Kenkre replaced them in the 2021–22 I-League. In June 2021, Akhil Kothari, India's youngest AFC A license holder, as new head coach of Kenkre. The club began their league journey on 4 March 2022 against Real Kashmir with earning a historic point in the 1–1 draw. Kenkre finished bottom after the phrase 1 and was placed in relegation stage. They achieved 12 points and got relegated to the 2022–23 I-League 2nd Division.

After being relegated at the end of the season, Kenkre was reinstated on sympathetic grounds and allowed to participate in the 2022–23 I-League season. The club later participated in Baji Raut Cup in Odisha, in which they reached semi-finals.

After struggling since beginning of the 2022–23 league season, Kenkre along with Sudeva Delhi, relegated from I-League.

Kit manufacturers and shirt sponsors

Stadium

Cooperage Ground in Nariman Point, Mumbai, is the home ground of Kenkre. It has artificial turf and has a seating capacity of 5,000. The club qualified for the I-League in 2021, but due to COVID-19 pandemic in India, league format was shortened and matches were played in few centralised venues. As the league came back with home-away format, Kenkre played its first home match at the Cooperage Ground against Churchill Brothers on 24 November 2022.

Players

First-team squad

Personnel

Current technical staff

Management
As of December 2022

Head coaching record

Honours

League
I-League 2nd Division
Runners-up (1): 2021
 MFA Elite Division
Champions (1): 2010
Runners-up (1): 2019–20

Cup
 Nadkarni Cup
Runners-up (1): 2009

Notable players

Past and present internationals
The player(s) below had senior/youth international cap(s) for their respective countries. Players with listed names represented their countries before or after playing for Kenkre FC.
 Orok Essien (2011–2012)
 Young Chimodzi Jr. (2014–2015)
 Tenzin Samdup (2021–)
  Anjan Bista (2023)

Other departments

Women's section
Kenkre has its women's team which plays in the Indian Women's League, the top flight of Women's football league system organised by the All India Football Federation.

Honours
WIFA Women's Football League
Champions (1): 2018–19
Runners-up (1): 2019–20

Youth (men's)
Since the inception of Kenkre, the club kept focus on nurturing youth talents and running academies. In Mumbai, the club built and runs eight academies with more than a thousand kids enrolled before the Covid-19 pandemic in India. Club's U17 team, which was managed by both Floyd Pinto and Akhil Kothari, previously participated in MSSA (Mumbai Schools Sports Association) tournaments.

Club's U-19 team participated in Maharashtra zone of 2014 I-League U19. The U17 team later took part in group stages of 2022–23 U-17 Youth Cup.

See also

 List of football clubs in Mumbai
 Sports in Maharashtra

Notes

References

External links

 Kenkre Football Club at the-aiff.com
 Kenkre Football Club at Soccerway
Kenkre Football Club at Sofascore
Team profile at Global Sports Archive

Association football clubs established in 2000
Football clubs in Mumbai
2000 establishments in Maharashtra
I-League clubs
I-League 2nd Division clubs